The Helms Athletic Foundation, founded in 1936, was a Los Angeles-based organization dedicated to the promotion of athletics and sportsmanship. Paul H. Helms was the organization's founder and benefactor, funding the foundation via his ownership of Helms Bakery. Bill Schroeder founded the organization with Helms and served as its managing director. The men were united in a love of amateur athletic competition.

The organization became well known for presenting awards and trophies for local, national, and international competition, naming the Southern California Player of the Month and Year, national championships in college basketball and college football, Rose Bowl Player of the Game, Coach of the Year, Pacific Coast football player of the year, and other such awards for athletic achievement. The organization dedicated Helms Hall in 1948, which housed a museum for sporting artifacts as well as the Helms Hall of Fame.

Following the death of Paul Helms in 1957 and the eventual closure of Helms Bakery in 1969, Schroeder sought new benefactors. The organization continued under a series of new sponsors as the United Savings–Helms Athletic Foundation, Citizens Savings Athletic Foundation, and First Interstate Bank Athletic Foundation. Schroeder died in 1987. Under the direction of Peter Ueberroth the Helms Athletic Foundation collection, library, and archives were absorbed into the Amateur Athletic Foundation of Los Angeles, later renamed the LA84 Foundation.

History

Founding

Schroeder brought to the partnership a large personal collection of sports memorabilia. He sought a corporate sponsor to finance a hall of fame to house his collection and to present awards to local athletes.

The idea was taken seriously by Paul Helms, who was himself invested in athletics both personally and professionally. The bakery with which he made his fortune was a sponsor of the 1932 Los Angeles Olympics, and "Helms Olympic Bread" continued to be associated with the competition. The organization was originally known as the Helms Olympic Athletic Foundation.

In 1936, with Helms' backing, Schroeder set to work from a rented office in downtown Los Angeles. As the organization's only employee, he issued frequent announcements of the selections he made for the Helms Athletic Foundation's various and numerous awards.

Helms Hall

The organization dedicated Helms Hall in 1948. The purpose-built building adjacent to Helms Bakery near Culver City housed a museum for the sports artifacts originally collected by Schroeder, as well as the Helms Hall of Fame.

Schroeder selected the organization's national champion teams and made All-America team selections in a number of college sports, including football and basketball. The Helms Foundation also operated a hall of fame for both college basketball and college football. Besides collegiate athletics, the organization operated halls of fame for professional football, Major League Baseball, the Pacific Coast League, basketball, fencing, golf, tennis, swimming, auto racing, track and field, and soaring.

Later years

After Paul Helms' death in 1957, his family continued supporting the organization until 1969, when the bakeries went out of business. Schroeder found a new benefactor in United Savings & Loan, and the organization's name became United Savings–Helms Athletic Foundation. United merged with Citizens Savings & Loan in 1973, when the organization became the Citizens Savings Athletic Foundation. It was again renamed in 1982 when First Interstate Bank assumed sponsorship, and it became the First Interstate Bank Athletic Foundation.

When the Helms Foundation dissolved, its historical holdings were absorbed into the collection of the Amateur Athletic Foundation, renamed the LA84 Foundation in 2007.

National championship selections

Basketball

The champions from 1900–01 through 1918–19 were selected retroactively in 1957. Those from 1919–20 through 1941–42 were selected retroactively in 1943.

The Helms Foundation began releasing Schroeder's national championship selections for college basketball in 1943, when in February 1943 it published his retroactive picks for the national champion for each year from the 1919–20 through 1941–42 seasons. Later in 1943, Schroeder picked a national basketball champion for the 1942–43 season, and he continued to select national basketball champions for the Helms Foundation annually through the 1981–82 season, its final year of selections. In 1957, the Helms Foundation also released Schroeder's retroactive picks for the college basketball champions for the 1900–1901 through 1918–19 seasons. The retroactive Helms national championships from 1900–01 through 1941–42 were the well-researched opinions of one person about teams that played during an era when, due to factors outside their control (e.g., minimal schedules, lack of intersectional play, differing rule interpretations, minimal statistics), it is difficult to know or assess the relative strength of the teams.

The National Invitation Tournament began play in 1938 and the NCAA tournament in 1939; until at the least the mid-1950s, the NIT was widely considered the more prestigious of the two. When Schroeder made his first set of retroactive championship picks in February 1943, he chose the NIT winner as the national champion for 1938 and 1939; for 1940, he chose USC (which won neither tournament that year); and for 1941 and 1942 he chose the NCAA Tournament winners as the national champion. After he began making annual picks in 1943, he selected the NCAA Tournament winner in every year except 1944 (when he picked undefeated Army, which won neither tournament) and 1954 (when he picked undefeated Kentucky, which won neither tournament). Thus, through the final Helms selection in 1982, NCAA Tournament winners Oregon (1939), Indiana (1940), Utah (1944), and La Salle (1954) were the only NCAA champions that were not also Helms champions. Some schools claim a Helms selection as a national championship.

Football

The NCAA recognizes the Helms Athletic Foundation as a "major selector" of college football national championships in their official records book.

The champions for 1883 through 1940 were selected retroactively.

Pro Football Hall of Fame
Helms Athletic Foundation selected players, coaches and administrators from 1950 through 1960 to its pro football hall of fame. Contrary to other halls of fame, some members were selected during their active playing/coaching careers.

Dan Reeves wasn't inducted to the hall, but he did received a "special award" for his "contribution to professional football in Los Angeles" during the 1950 inaugural class ceremony.

World Trophy
The World Trophy, originally known as the Helms Award, was an annual sporting award established by the Helms Athletic Foundation in 1939 to honor the foremost amateur athlete of each continent of the world, including Africa, Asia, Australia, Europe, North America, and South America. Even though the organization was established in 1936, the awards date back to 1896, the year of the first Summer Olympics.

Winners:
World Trophy for Australasia
World Trophy for Africa
World Trophy for Asia
World Trophy for Europe
World Trophy for North America
World Trophy for South America

See also

 Mythical national championship
 College football national championships in NCAA Division I FBS
 Premo-Porretta Power Poll
 Helms Foundation College Basketball Player of the Year

References

College football awards organizations
College football championships
History of college basketball in the United States
Sports foundations based in the United States